Kippax railway station was a railway station on the Castleford–Garforth line in West Yorkshire, England. The station opened in 1878 and closed to passengers in 1951, although the line remained open for a further 18 years for diversions and goods traffic.

History
The station was on the western edge of Kippax village adjacent to the hamlet of Great Preston. Like all the other stations on the line, it had just one platform on the eastern side of the line. The station opened to passengers in August 1878, but had opened to goods traffic four months earlier. As with other sections of the line, the station did not possess a passing loop, though trains could pass in the freight loop that led into the goods yard.

In 1880, the station's water tower was used to supply fresh water to the people living in and around the station area (Great Preston). An  outbreak of fever, diphtheria and diarrhoea in previous years had led to the railway company providing fresher water than that already afforded to the locals. The tower, which was situated on the main platform, was not fitted with an apparatus to transfer water to locomotives.

The chief export from Kippax was aggregate; a local quarry had a siding just to the north of the station. Kippax was the busiest station on the line as it served a larger and well established village. In 1911, 44,000 tickets were issued compared to Ledston's 15,000.

The station closed to passengers in January 1951, with closure to goods in September 1963. No trace of the station remains, though the trackbed has been converted into a cycleway.

References

Sources

External links

Disused railway stations in Leeds
Railway stations in Great Britain opened in 1878
Railway stations in Great Britain closed in 1951
Former North Eastern Railway (UK) stations